Big Willy or Big Willie may refer to:

 Big Willie (tank), a prototype of the first British tank
 Big Willie Style, the debut studio album by Will Smith
 Destroy All Humans! Big Willy Unleashed, a game for the Wii

See also 
 Big Bill (disambiguation)